Baldry is a surname. Notable people with the name include:

 Alfred Lys Baldry (1858–1939), English art critic and painter
Anna Costanza Baldry (1970 –2019), Italian criminologist
 Cherith Baldry (b. 1947), writer of fantasy fiction
 Dennis Baldry (b. 1931), English cricketer
 Eileen Baldry, Australian criminologist
 Long John Baldry (1941–2005), singer and actor
 Simon Baldry (b. 1976), English footballer
 Sir Tony Baldry (b. 1951), MP
 Thomas Baldry (1481–1524), MP